Ernesto D'Alessio (born Ernesto Alonso Vargas Contreras on March 6, 1977, in Mexico City, Mexico) is a Mexican actor and singer.

Life

D'Alessio was born in Mexico City in 1977. He is son of Mexican singer and actress Lupita D'Alessio and the singer and actor Jorge Vargas. Has one older brother Jorge Francisco (deceased) and a younger brother, two younger half-sisters of the second marriage of his father, and a younger half-brother of the fifth marriage of his mother.

In 1990 he debuted as an actor. In 1997 starred in telenovela El alma no tiene color. In 1999 played as Mateo in DKDA: Sueños de juventud. In 2005 starred in Contra viento y marea as main antagonist.

In 2006 he participated in reality show Cantando por un sueño and finished in 3rd place. The same year his participated in another reality show, in Reyes de la canción and finished in 2nd place.

Filmography

Theatre
Los Miserables – Marius

Soundtracks
El uno para el otro – DKDA: Sueños de juventud
Mi viejo – Heridas de amor
Mí mujer – Que te perdone Dios

References

External links 
 

1977 births
Living people
Mexican male telenovela actors
Mexican male television actors
Mexican male film actors
Mexican male stage actors
Mexican male voice actors
Mexican television presenters
Mexican television talk show hosts
20th-century Mexican male actors
21st-century Mexican male actors
Male actors from Mexico City
Singers from Mexico City
People from Mexico City
21st-century Mexican singers
21st-century Mexican male singers